Tun Ahmad Fairuz bin Sheikh Abdul Halim (born 1 November 1941) is a retired Malaysian lawyer who served as the fourth Chief Justice of Malaysia. A controversial figure, he held that position from 2003 to 2006. In August 2006, he courted controversy by suggesting the abolishment of English Common Law to be replaced by Islamic Syariah Law. In September 2007, he was implicated in a 'judicial fixing' scandal. He retired in November 2006 and was replaced on 2 November 2006 by Abdul Hamid Mohamad as the Chief Justice.

Early life and education 
Ahmad Fairuz Sheikh Abdul Halim was born in Alor Setar, Kedah on 1 November 1941. He received his Bachelor of Laws from the National University of Singapore and later obtained his Master of Laws in International and Comparative Laws from the University of Brussels, Belgium.

Career
He joined the Malaysian Judicial and Legal Service on 4 April 1967 as a Cadet Legal Officer and held various positions such as President of Sessions Court, State Legal Advisor and chairman of the advisory board, Prime Minister's Department. On 1 December 1988 he was appointed Judicial Commissioner of High Court Malaya and was later appointed a High Court Judge. On 1 December 1995 he was elevated as a Court of Appeal Judge until his appointment as a Federal Court Judge on 1 September 2000.

Lingam Tape 'Judicial Fixing' Scandal
See video clip: 
See Also : Lingam Video Clip

On 19 September 2007, online daily Malaysiakini broke a story on a tape released by former Deputy Prime Minister Anwar Ibrahim, where senior lawyer V.K. Lingam was seen talking to someone believed to be the Chief Justice Ahmad Fairuz. The grainy eight-minute video footage was taken in 2002 at Lingam's Kelana Jaya house. At that time, Ahmad Fairuz was the Chief Judge of Malaya (judiciary's No. 3 post).

The video showed Lingam expressing concern that the outgoing CJ Mohamed Dzaiddin Abdullah was moving 'his men' into top judiciary posts. The conversation revolved around the urgent need to get Ahmad Fairuz appointed as Court of Appeal President (No. 2) and then Chief Justice (No. 1). Lingam expressed his plan to get tycoon Vincent Tan, a close ally of then Prime Minister Mahathir Mohamad, and Tengku Adnan Tengku Mansor, a minister in PM's Department to talk to Mahathir on the appointment of judges. Allegedly, this was in return for Ahmad Fairuz's "suffering" in the election petition cases in the past where Ahmad Fairuz had ruled against the Opposition.

Following the revelation, over 2,000 lawyers heeding the call of the Malaysian Bar Council walked from the Palace of Justice to the Prime Minister's Department to demand the Prime Minister to set up a Royal Commission to investigate. On 17 November 2007, Prime Minister Abdullah Ahmad Badawi announced that a Royal Commission would be set up to investigate the matter. Ahmad Fairuz denied his involvement, and Anwar responded that he "would love to see him (Ahmad Fairuz) defend himself in the dock as to whether he was lying."

The Royal Commission's methods of arriving at certain conclusions, however, have been criticised by some. They claim that the alleged conversation was a monologue, and, therefore, the commission could not have reliably confirmed who was at the other end of the line. The Commission neither established that the phone call had come from Ahmad Fairuz, nor made a connection between the two, as even Lingam's secretary testified that to her knowledge Ahmad Fairuz had never tried to contact Lingam at his office.

Commission chairman Tan Sri Haidar Mohamed Noor presented a two-volume report on the findings to the Yang di-Pertuan Agong Tuanku Mizan Zainal Abidin at the Istana Negara on 9 May 2008.

Personal life 
He is married to Mazni bt Mohd Noor and they have two children.

Honours

Honours of Malaysia
  :
  Commander of the Order of Loyalty to the Crown of Malaysia (PSM) – Tan Sri (2002)
  Grand Commander of the Order of Loyalty to the Crown of Malaysia (SSM) – Tun (2005)
  :
  Knight Companion of the Order of Loyalty to the Royal House of Kedah (DSDK) – Dato' (1999)
  Knight Grand Companion of the Order of Loyalty to the Royal House of Kedah (SSDK) – Dato' Seri (2004)
  :
  Knight Grand Commander of the Order of the Life of the Crown of Kelantan (SJMK) – Dato' (2003)
  Knight Grand Commander of the Order of the Crown of Kelantan (SPMK) – Dato' (2005)
  :
  Knight Grand Commander of the Order of the Crown of Selangor (SPMS) – Dato' Seri (2003)
  :
  Member Knight Companion of the Order of Sultan Mahmud I of Terengganu (DSMT) – Dato' (1991)
  Knight Grand Commander of the Order of the Crown of Terengganu (SPMT) – Dato' (1994)
  Knight Grand Commander of the Order of Sultan Mizan Zainal Abidin of Terengganu (SSMZ) – Dato' Seri (2003)

References

20th-century Malaysian judges
21st-century Malaysian judges
1941 births
Living people
Chief justices of Malaysia
Presidents of the Court of Appeal of Malaysia
People from Kedah
Malaysian people of Malay descent
Malaysian Muslims
Vrije Universiteit Brussel alumni
National University of Singapore alumni
Grand Commanders of the Order of Loyalty to the Crown of Malaysia
Commanders of the Order of Loyalty to the Crown of Malaysia
Knights Grand Commander of the Order of the Crown of Terengganu